Sword of Dracula is a 2004 horror comic book published by several American companies, including Image Comics, IDW Publishing, and Digital Webbing. The series focuses on a group of UN connected commandos called the Polidorium. The series is created by writer Jason Henderson and includes a round-robin group of artists, including Greg Scott, Terry Pallot, and James Fry (as William Belk). Matt Webb colored one issue of the second volume. Covers were provided by Tony Harris and Greg Scott.

In the series, vampires are allegories for terrorists, with Dracula presented as "the Osama Bin Laden of vampires" and a war criminal. The comic also gives Dracula more enhanced powers, including the ability to control human blood with his mind, and even make buildings and weapons out of "bloodwood," or mind-controlled blood.

In August 2004, the comic featured Senator John Kerry in a flash-back to Vietnam, in which Kerry led a PT boat hunt for Dracula.

In October and December 2004, Sword of Dracula'''s Ronnie Van Helsing appeared in a two-part Vampirella story drawn by Greg Scott. 

On March 7, 2007, a front page Wall Street Journal article cited Sword of Dracula'' comics.

External links
Official site of Sword of Dracula comic
Official site of writer Jason Henderson
Austin Chronicle article, "Overnight Sensation: 'Sword of Dracula' creator Jason Henderson is taking over the (fantasy) world

2004 comics debuts
2004 comics endings
Comics set in the 2000s
Comics based on Dracula
Vampires in comics
Horror comics
Image Comics titles
Image Comics vampires